Félix Toranzos (born October 30, 1962) is a Paraguayan artist, architect and graphic designer, considered to be one of the most conspicuous representatives of the new generation of artists in Paraguay.

Early life 

Born in Asunción, capital of the Republic of Paraguay, on October 30, 1964. His parents are  an artist himself, and Angelina Miers, of Argentina. He attended the elementary school “General Eduvigis Diaz”. His Secondary School was at Colegio Nacional de la Capital.

In 1973 and 1974, he conducted studies in the Escuela de Bellas Artes Asunción. In 1980 he ended his career of architecture, made in the National University of Asunción.

His career

He has delivered classes in drawing and painting workshops at the Centre for Visual Arts, as part of a group of Paraguayan and foreign artists who devote part of their time to training young apprentices in the art, technique and taste for the aesthetic. His first sample dates back to 1979. Since then, he has raised to great heights his artistic production, which gave him a privileged place among Paraguayan painters, to become one of the most prominent artists of his generation. 
He has made significant individual and collective exhibitions organized by several galleries and art centers, Asuncion Buenos Aires, Peru Spain, Brazil, Japan and United States of America. 
His works are part of the collection of the Museum of Contemporary Art Paraguayan Centre for Visual Arts. They are also given in Museo del Barro Asunción.
 
Part of its plastic production, integrates the Collection of the Art Museum of the America of the Organization of American States Washington DC (OAS Art Museum of the USA) 
Numerous private collections of Paraguay and the United States contain his works, with some produced by Felix Toranzos.

Works 
Among his major solo exhibitions include: 

1979: Exhibition of Drawings, Galería Arte-Sanos.
1982: Designs, Exhibition of Drawings, Centro de Estudios Brasileros.
1983: Exhibition of Drawings and Objects, Galería Arte-Sanos.
1985: “Transvisión de Palladio”, Drawings and other techniques, Galería Fábrica.
1986/87: Drawing and Paintings, Galería Arte-Sanos.
“Intro-Misiones”, Drawings and other techniques, Galería Fábrica.
Exhibition of Drawings, Café de la Plaza.

1988: “Asunción-Una Escenografía Utópica”. Drawings and other techniques, Galería Fábrica.
Paintings Exhibition, Café de la Plaza.
1989: Paintings Exhibition, Condovac, San Bernardino.
Paintings Exhibition, Galería Fábrica.
Paintings Exhibition, Fundapel, Salón Municipal, Pelotas Brasil.

1990: Paintings Exhibition, Galería Fábrica.
Paintings Exhibition, Galería Arte-Sanos.

1991: Objects Exhibition, Pequeña Galería.
Paintings Exhibition, Galería Arte-Sanos.
Objects and Paintings Exhibition, Galería Fábrica.
Watercolor Exhibition, Galería Forum.
Watercolor Exhibition, Galería Arte-Nuestro, Villa Rica.

1992: Cajas y Objetos, Pequeña Galería.
Drawings and Objects Exhibition, Galería Arte-Nuestro, Villa Rica.
Watercolor Exhibition, Café de la Plaza.
Drawings and Painting Exhibition, Galería Ana Scappini.

1993: Objects and Paintings, Centro Cultural de la Ciudad.
Objects and Paintings, Centro de Arte, Corriente Alterna, Lima, Perú.
Drawings Exhibition, Galería El Patio.
Paintings Exhibition, Galería Arte-Sanos.

1994: "Onomástico", Paintings Exhibition, Galería Fábrica.
"Asunción-Otra Escenografía Utópica", Galería de Arte del Patio López.

1995: Paintings Exhibition, Galería Lamarca.
"Taller de Arquitectura", Drawings Exhibition, Espacio Miguel Acevedo, Centro Cultural de la Ciudad.
"Buonarroti, los trazos preliminares", Drawings and Paintings, Galería Fábrica.

1996: Paintings Exhibition, Aniversario Da Vinci Café.
"Delgado Rodas, Los trazos preliminares", Drawings and Paintings, Galería Fábrica.
"Asunción, los escenarios de la utopía", Galería Scappini-Lamarca.
"Objects and collage", Galería Fábrica.
"Leonardo, los primeros trazos", Verónica Torres, Colección de Arte.

1997: "Sueños Robados", objects and collage, Galería Fábrica.
1998: "Primigenia", Collage and Paintings, Gabinete Florian Paucke, Centro de Artes Visuales/Museo del Barro.
1999: Paintings Exhibition, Centro de Artes Visuales/Museo del Barro.
 
"Primigenia", paintings and collage, Galería Scappini-Lamarca.

2000: "Geometrías", Paintings, Centro Cultural Citibank.
"La Estancia de Rafael", Paintings, Galería Fábrica.

2001: Paintings Exhibition, Centro Cultural CitiBank.
“Trans-visión de Palladio”. Galería Fábrica.

2002: “Fuschias y otras flores”, Verónica Torres, Colección de Arte.
2003: Objects and Paintings Exhibition, Galería Fábrica.
2004: Objects and Paintings Exhibition. Galería Fábrica.
2005: Drawings and Paintings Exhibition "Botticelli", Galería Matices.
Drawings and Paintings Exhibition, Centro Cultural Citibank.
Objects and Paintings Exhibition, Galería Fabrica.

2006: "Una Interpretación de la Obra de Luís Toranzos", Verónica Torres Colección de Arte.

"La Resistencia de los materiales", Centro Cultural Español, Juan de Salazar.
Drawings and Paintings Exhibition. Galería Matices.
Paintings Exhibition, Centro Cultural Citibank.

Likewise, he has taken part in numerous exhibitions, and biennial collective samples in Asunción and other major cities around the world.

Awards and honors

Style

In his more than thirty years of artistic production he has become a joiner of painting, engraving and other facilities, using different mediums ranging from the simple canvas up tolarge racks of plaster, marked by brilliant combinations of painting and engraving. 
His assemblages are creations of three-dimensional pieces with knots and tensions that are interwoven in the area. 
His style is marked by an exquisite combination of colors and textures.

His architectural studies have served as a liaison for the expressive use of space, making works in a perfect harmony between the rigidity of the geometry and the lightness of metaphorical poetry. 
His drawings contain an exquisite balance between the schematic and the ethereal. 
On occasion, he has been inspired by works of the Renaissance period, introducing a series of works dedicated to the great masters like Michelangelo, Leonardo da Vinci and Raphael.

Family

Felix's father, Don Luis Toranzos, having been a widower with two daughters, Candida Maria and the other, Angelina Rosalie, married in second marriage with Angelina Miers. 
His children are Haydée Rafaela, Dario Luis Augusto Bardel and Felix, the oldest son. 
His family lives in Asunción now.

References 

 Escobar Ticio and Salerno, Osvaldo. La Resistencia de los Materiales. Felix Toranzos. Centro Cultural de España. 2006. Asunción.

External links 
 Salazarte.
 PARAGUAY PAVILION
 Los argumentos : exposición de artes visuales : Centro Cultural de España "Juan de Salazar"
 Eight artists from Paraguay : Pedro Aguero, Enrique Careaga, Oscar Centurion

1962 births
Living people
Paraguayan painters
Paraguayan architects